The Green Symphony  is an album composed by Sharreth in 2015. Sharreth scored the music, and sang the vocals with K. S. Chithra, backed by Balabhaskar (violin), Balasai (flute), D.A. Sreenivas (mridangam), Vikram (percussion) and Chandrajith (tabala). The album was produced by K. S. Chithra 'Audiotracs'.

Track listing

All songs composed by Sharreth.

References

Malayalam music albums
2015 albums